Will Kraus (born March 22, 1973) is an American politician who represents eastern Jackson County, Missouri in the Missouri Senate. He is a member of the Republican Party. The district includes the cities of Blue Springs, Grain Valley, Greenwood, Independence (in part), Lake Lotawana, Tapawingo, Lee's Summit, Lone Jack and Oak Grove.

Missouri House of Representatives
Kraus was first elected to the Missouri House of Representatives in 2004 after defeating Democrat Mike Sager in the general election 8,580 votes to 6,526. He was re-elected in 2006 and 2008 respectively. He has served as Vice-Chair on both the Missouri House of Representatives' Utilities and Health Care Policy Committees, and has also served on the Job Creation and Economic Development Committee.

Missouri Senate
On August 3, 2010, Kraus won the Republican Primary for Missouri's 8th District State Senatorial District; which represents Eastern Jackson County, defeating State Representatives Bryan Pratt and Gary Dusenberg.

On November 2, 2010, Kraus won the general election against Kevin Parr (Libertarian) and was sworn in as the state senator for the 8th District on January 5, 2011.  He is running unopposed for re-election to the Senate in 2014.

On July 11, 2014, Kraus announced his intention to run for Missouri Secretary of State in 2016. He lost to Jay Ashcroft in the Republican primary.

Electoral history

Personal life
Kraus resides in Lee's Summit, MO with his wife Carmen, and his two sons Tylor and Tannor. Tylor, the elder of the two sons, is in the Army. Tannor, graduated in May 2016, and plans to attend Missouri Baptist on a basketball scholarship.

References

1973 births
Living people
Democratic Party members of the Missouri House of Representatives
21st-century American politicians